Guillermo Coria was the defending champion, but could not compete this year after being banned for doping in December 2001.

Fernando González won in the final 6–3, 6–7(5–7), 7–6(7–4) against Nicolás Lapentti, becoming the first chilean player to win this tournament.

Seeds

  Nicolás Lapentti (final)
  Félix Mantilla (second round)
  Alberto Martín (first round)
  Marcelo Ríos (first round)
  Jérôme Golmard (first round)
  Gastón Gaudio (second round)
  David Nalbandian (second round, defaulted due to verbal abuse)
  Andrea Gaudenzi (first round)

Draw

Finals

Top half

Bottom half

References

External links
 Main draw (ATP)
 Qualifying draw (ATP)

Chile Open (tennis)
2002 ATP Tour